Manlius Township is one of twenty-five townships in Bureau County, Illinois, USA.  As of the 2020 census, its population was 574 and it contained 306 housing units.  Manlius Township changed its name from Green River Township on an unknown date.

Geography

Cities
 Manlius

Cemeteries
The township contains these three cemeteries: Follett, Manlius and Sand Hill Baptist.

Major highways
  Illinois Route 88

Demographics
As of the 2020 census there were 574 people, 246 households, and 158 families residing in the township. The racial makeup of the township was 93.90% White, 0.17% African American, 0.00% Native American, 0.17% Asian, 0.17% Pacific Islander, 0.52% from other races, and 5.05% from two or more races. Hispanic or Latino of any race were 2.09% of the population.

There were 246 households, out of which 17.10% had children under the age of 18 living with them, 48.37% were married couples living together, 10.57% had a female householder with no spouse present, and 35.77% were non-families. 34.60% of all households were made up of individuals, and 22.00% had someone living alone who was 65 years of age or older. The average household size was 2.11 and the average family size was 2.59.

The township's age distribution consisted of 12.5% under the age of 18, 11.2% from 18 to 24, 25.8% from 25 to 44, 31.5% from 45 to 64, and 18.9% who were 65 years of age or older. The median age was 45.5 years. For every 100 females, there were 142.5 males. For every 100 females age 18 and over, there were 145.4 males.

The median income for a household in the township was $59,167, and the median income for a family was $105,000. Males had a median income of $37,813 versus $36,202 for females. The per capita income for the township was $36,438. About 6.3% of families and 12.2% of the population were below the poverty line, including 9.8% of those under age 18 and 14.3% of those age 65 or over.

School districts
 Bureau Valley Community Unit School District 340

Political districts
 Illinois' 11th congressional district
 State House District 74
 State Senate District 37

References
 
 United States Census Bureau 2007 TIGER/Line Shapefiles
 United States National Atlas

External links
 City-Data.com
 Illinois State Archives

Townships in Bureau County, Illinois
Populated places established in 1849
Townships in Illinois
1849 establishments in Illinois